Gersh Kuntzman   is an American journalist.

Career

Journalism
Kuntzman previously worked for the New York Post, writing the column "MetroGnome," which ran during 1995–2004. He had a weekly column for Newsweek online that ran during 2001–2005.

In 2005, Kuntzman became editor of The Brooklyn Paper, a group of community newspapers covering Kings County, New York. During his tenure, he won awards for Editor of the Year and Columnist of the Year from the Suburban Newspapers of America. His editorial writing also won awards from the Independent Free Papers of America. That organization also gave The Brooklyn Paper its Vic Jose Award in 2009.

Kuntzman gave mainstream coverage to the 2008 Nathan's Hot Dog Eating Contest at Coney Island.

In 2012, Kuntzman became deputy managing editor for news at the New York Daily News, where he later became a columnist until 2016.

In 2016, Kuntzman became the center of widespread attention when he wrote an article titled "Firing an AR-15 is horrifying, menacing, and very very loud." In the article, Kuntzman says that he traveled to a gun range in Philadelphia to shoot a "military-style weapon" so that he could better understand such weapons' appeals in the wake of the Orlando nightclub shooting. He said, "It felt to me like a bazooka—and sounded like a cannon." Kuntzman further described the experience by saying that "The recoil bruised my shoulder" and "The smell of sulfur and destruction made me sick." Some consider the most controversial part of the article was when Kuntzman claimed, "The explosions—like a bomb—gave me a temporary form of PTSD". Kuntzman faced widespread ridicule for the article, particularly the claim that he suffered from PTSD, with some critics saying such a claim diminished the severity of PTSD suffered by veterans. Kuntzman later wrote another article further criticizing gun owners.

In April 2016, Kuntzman criticized U.S. government's drone assassination program and implied that the Obama administration may be guilty of war crimes. He also wanted President Obama to apologize for the atomic bombings of Hiroshima and Nagasaki in 1945.

Following the assassination of Andrei Karlov, Russian ambassador to Turkey, on 19 December 2016, Kuntzman compared his murder by Mevlüt Mert Altıntaş to the assassination of Nazi German diplomat Ernst vom Rath by Jewish student Herschel Grynszpan, saying "justice has been served". The Russian Foreign Ministry spokeswoman wrote on her Facebook page to Kuntzman: "you have said that the fight of the Jewish people against anti-Semitism in 1930s amounts to the terrorist ways of the Islamic State and Jabhat al-Nusra ... Are they really the same to you?"

In 2017, he began work as breaking news editor of Newsweek; he was fired in February 2018. He joined Streetsblog NYC as its editor-in-chief later that year in July.

Activism
Kuntzman was featured in a December 2022 New York Times article that focused on citizens "cleaning up" license plates which had been intentionally damaged or obscured for the purpose of avoiding tolls and speed cameras. A subsequent article in The New Yorker featured the same work.

Personal life
Kuntzman described himself as a supporter of the Democratic presidential candidate Hillary Clinton.

Footnotes

External links

Daily News archive for Gersh Kuntzman Daily News writers page

American columnists
Living people
People from Park Slope
Year of birth missing (living people)